The Lord at first did Adam make, alternatively The Lord at first had Adam made is a traditional English Christmas carol which was collected and first published in 1822 in Davies Gilbert's collection Some Ancient Christmas Carols...Formerly Sung in the West of England. The carol relates the events of Genesis, Chapter 3, relating the evils that have befallen humanity since that first fall and humanity's subsequent redemption; during Advent, a traditional theme is of the birth of Jesus being the coming of the "Second Adam".

The carol was sung in the West Country of England on Christmas Eve. In Davies Gilbert's preface to his 1822 publication, he writes

It was popularised by its inclusion in John Stainer and Henry Ramsden Bramley's Christmas Carols, New and Old of 1877, albeit in a Victorianised non-modal form, with a grammatically corrected text. In this version, the carol was chosen by Edward White Benson to be the opening carol at the original Festival of Nine Lessons and Carols at Truro Cathedral in 1880.

In addition to Gilbert Davies' collected version, another tune also exists and there are numerous textual variations, including additional verses.

See also
 List of Christmas carols

References

Christmas carols
English Christian hymns
Year of song unknown